

Gmina Biała (Gemeinde Zülz) is an urban-rural gmina (administrative district) in Prudnik County, Opole Voivodeship, in Upper Silesia in Poland.

Since 2006 the commune, like much of the area, has been bilingual in German and Polish.

Villages
Apart from the town of Biała, Gmina Biała contains the villages and settlements of:

Browiniec Polski
Brzeźnica
Chrzelice
Czartowice
Dębina
Frącki
Górka Prudnicka
Gostomia
Grabina
Józefów
Kolnowice
Krobusz
Łącznik
Laskowiec
Ligota Bialska
Miłowice
Mokra
Nowa Wieś Prudnicka
Ogiernicze
Olbrachcice
Otoki
Pogórze
Prężyna
Radostynia
Rostkowice
Śmicz
Solec
Wasiłowice
Wilków
Żabnik

Neighbouring gminas
Gmina Biała is bordered by the gminas of Głogówek, Korfantów, Lubrza, Prószków, Prudnik and Strzeleczki.

Twin towns – sister cities

Gmina Biała is twinned with:
 Marienheide, Germany
 Město Albrechtice, Czech Republic
 Vlčice, Czech Republic

References

Biala
Prudnik County
Bilingual communes in Poland